Diasemia is a genus of moths in the family Crambidae.

Species
Diasemia accalis (Walker, 1859)
Diasemia completalis Walker, 1866
Diasemia disjectalis (Zeller, 1852)
Diasemia grammalis Doubleday in White and Doubleday, 1843
Diasemia impulsalis (Walker, 1859)
Diasemia lepidoneuralis Strand, 1918
Diasemia lunalis Gaede, 1916
Diasemia monostigma Hampson, 1913
Diasemia reticularis (Linnaeus, 1761)
Diasemia trigonialis Hampson, 1913
Diasemia zebralis Maes, 2011

Former species
Diasemia erubescens Hampson, 1899

Synonyms
Junior synonyms of Diasemia are:
 Diasema (lapsus)
 Goniogramma Mann, 1854
 Prodelia Doubleday, [1849]

Footnotes

References

  (2005): Markku Savela's Lepidoptera and some other life forms – Diasemia. Version of 2005-NOV-01. Retrieved 2010-APR-12.

Spilomelinae
Crambidae genera
Taxa named by Jacob Hübner